Elatine minima is a species of flowering plant in the family Elatinaceae, native to eastern Canada (Newfoundland island, Nova Scotia, Ontario and Prince Edward Island), the north-central United States (Minnesota and Wisconsin), the northeastern United States (Connecticut, Massachusetts, Michigan, New Hampshire, New Jersey, New York state, Pennsylvania and Rhode Island), and the southeastern United States (Maryland, Tennessee, and Virginia). It was first described by Thomas Nuttall in 1817 as Crypta minima and transferred to Elatine in 1836.

References

Elatinaceae
Flora of Eastern Canada
Flora of Western Canada
Flora of the Northeastern United States
Flora of the Southeastern United States
Flora of the North-Central United States
Plants described in 1817
Flora without expected TNC conservation status